Loai Muhammad Naseem (born 1969) is a Saudi fashion designer, graphic designer and business executive. He is best known for establishing Tafaseel International Trading Limited company (Lomar).

Since inception, Lomar has become a pioneer in the traditional Saudi men's apparel market, winning a loyal fan base and receiving multiple accolades. This includes winning Saudi Fast Growth Startup 100 List twice.

Forbes ranked Naseem #2 on the list of Leaders Inspiring a Kingdom Saudi Arabia's Entrepreneurial Elite in 2014. Endeavor ranked Nassem #1 on the List of Leaders Inspiring a Kingdom Saudi Arabia's Entrepreneurial Elite in 2012.

Biography

Early life and education 
Born on January 10, 1969, in Jeddah, Saudi Arabia, Naseem graduated high school there. Unhappy with his business studies, he quit school after three years and began launching businesses with his father. In 1994 Loai travelled to the US to study graphic design at the Art Institute of Houston. He went on to work for advertising firms, and won several international awards for his designs.

Background and career 
When Naseem returned to Jeddah three years later, he accepted a position as art director at the Leo Burnett Advertising Agency before becoming one of three co founding partners of "3points Advertising Agency" in 1998. Tired of wearing the same plain Saudi thobe to work each day, he began to design his own thobes with the help of his wife and a tailor. By 2004, while still a partner at 3points, Naseem was designing and selling thobes out of his home for more than 100 customers. Annual sales that year reached SR75,000 ($19,900). By the time he co-founded Lomar the following year, sales had climbed to SR1.5 million ($399,000).

See also 
 Thobe

References

21st-century Saudi Arabian businesspeople
1969 births
Living people
People from Jeddah